The Star Tournament was a professional golf tournament played in England and sponsored by The Star, a London evening newspaper. It was held from 1945 to 1947. The total prize money was £1,500.

The 1945 and 1946 events involved 36 holes of stroke play over two days. The leading 16 then played knockout matchplay over the next two days. In 1947 the 36-hole stroke play stage was played on a single day using both Wentworth courses with 32 golfers qualifying. There were then four rounds of knockout matchplay over the next two days, followed by a 36-hole final on the fourth day.

Winners

The 1945 and 1946 finals were over 18 holes. The 1947 final was over 36 holes.

References

Golf tournaments in England
Recurring sporting events established in 1945
Recurring sporting events disestablished in 1947
1945 establishments in England
1947 disestablishments in England